St. Mark's Church is a Church in the neighbourhood of Madipakkam in Chennai, Tamil Nadu, India.

Notes

References 

 

Churches in Chennai